This is a listing of the people who have taken the office of President of the Senate of Madagascar, also known as Speaker of the Senate.

See also
Senate (Madagascar)

References

Politics of Madagascar
Madagscar, Senate